The Salvador Dalí Museum is an art museum in St. Petersburg, Florida, United States, dedicated to the works of Salvador Dalí. Designed by Yann Weymouth, the museum is located on the downtown St. Petersburg waterfront by 5th Avenue Southeast, Bay Shore Drive, and Dan Wheldon Way.

Description

The museum is a member of the American Alliance of Museums (AAM) and of the North American Reciprocal Museums program.

The museum features a variety of different events for families to attend. Some events include performances, workshops, films, lectures, different types of fundraising, and food and drink events. Many previous events have allowed members to participate in handmade holiday card workshops where participants created their very own holiday card including a Dalí theme. In addition, there has been weekly poetry performances and lectures such as coffee with a curator, a presentation on a theme-oriented topic that discusses a variety of topics in relation to Dalí.

History

Shortly before marrying in 1942, Reynolds and Eleanor Morse attended a Dalí retrospective at the Cleveland Museum of Art. Intrigued by the artist's subject matter, and impressed by his draftsmanship, they bought their first painting a year later. This purchase began a 40-year relationship as patrons and friends of Dalí that resulted in a comprehensive collection of original Dalí work.

Until 1971, the Morses displayed their collection in their Cleveland, Ohio, home. When they loaned over 200 pieces to a Dalí retrospective in 1965, they realized that 25 years of curation had produced a unique collection that needed a permanent home.

In March 1971, with Salvador Dalí presiding over the opening, the Morses opened a museum adjacent to their office building in Beachwood, Ohio. By the end of the decade, with an overwhelming number of visitors, the Morses decided to again move their collection.

After a drawn-out search which drew national attention, a marine warehouse in downtown St. Petersburg, Florida was rehabilitated and the museum opened on March 7, 1982, where it remained until 2010.

In mid-2008, a new location for the Dali museum was announced. A new building was designed by Yann Weymouth of the architectural firm HOK and built by The Beck Group under the leadership of then-CEO Henry C. Beck III.  Located on the downtown waterfront next to the Mahaffey Theater, on the former site of the Bayfront Center, (an arena which had been demolished in 2004), the new, larger, and more storm-secure museum was opened on January 11, 2011.

On April 18, 2012, the AIA's Florida Chapter placed the building on its list of Florida Architecture: 100 Years. 100 Places.

Artworks

The museum's collection includes 96 oil paintings, over 100 watercolors and drawings, 1,300 graphics, photographs, sculptures, and objets d'art, plus an extensive archival library. In July 2020, the museum added a new exhibit called "At Home with Dali". Permanent collection displays are periodically rotated, and several temporary shows are mounted each year.

The museum is home to more masterpieces of Dalí than any other museum in the world, including the large-scale paintings The Hallucinogenic Toreador, The Discovery of America by Christopher Columbus, The Ecumenical Council, Geopoliticus Child Watching the Birth of the New Man and The Disintegration of the Persistence of Memory.

In addition to displaying the work of Dalí, the museum aims to educate the public and promote understanding, enjoyment, and scholarly examination of art through the exhibition of works by Dalí and artists of similar vision.

With the exception of the Dalí Theater-Museum created by Dalí himself in his hometown of Figueres in Spain, the St. Petersburg Dalí Museum has the world's largest collections of Dalí's works.

During the 2020 COVID-19 pandemic, the Salvador Dalí Museum made their gallery available for viewing online.

Partnerships and publications 
The museum offers several of its own publications in its store, primarily guidebooks and books about exhibitions.  Avant-garde Studies is an annual online publication that covers talks and conferences presented at the museum, as well as peer-reviewed papers on avant-garde topics.  The museum runs the Dalí Summer Rec Center Program for children aged 7 to 12.  Opera at The Dalí arranges opera singers to perform on the helical staircase in the museum.

Temporary exhibits 
Picasso and the Allure of the South is on display from January 22, 2022, until May 22, 2022, and explores the influence of Southern Europe on Pablo Picasso’s artwork over six decades of his career. The exhibit includes 79 paintings, drawings, and collages, and was organized in collaboration with the Musée national Picasso-Paris.

See also 
Dalí Theatre and Museum – Museum of Dalí in his home town of Figueres, Catalonia, Spain
 Gala Dali Castle Museum-House – in Púbol, Spain
 Espace Dalí – in Paris, France, museum of Dalí's drawings and sculptures
 Dalí – Die Ausstellung am Potsdamer Platz – in Berlin, Germany: more than 450 original artworks by Salvador Dalí
 List of single-artist museums

References

External links 

 Salvador Dalí Museum website
 "Dali Lives", Art Meets Artificial Intelligence at The Dali Museum

1982 establishments in Florida
Art museums established in 1982
Art museums and galleries in Florida
Dalí, Salvador
Buildings and structures completed in 2011
Cultural infrastructure completed in 2011
Institutions accredited by the American Alliance of Museums
Dalí, Salvador
Museums in St. Petersburg, Florida
Salvador Dalí
Surrealism
Tourist attractions in the Tampa Bay area